The Definitive Vince Guaraldi is Fantasy/Concord Records compilation album of songs by American jazz pianist/composer Vince Guaraldi released on November 3, 2009. It contains 31 tracks over two CDs, highlighting Guaraldi's Peanuts work as well his collaborations with guitarist Bola Sete.

The album was released on 180-gram vinyl on November 20, 2015 as a 4-LP box set.

As the release was label-specific containing material Guaraldi recorded for Fantasy Records, it excludes tracks from Guaraldi's three Warner Bros.-Seven Arts releases (Oh Good Grief!, The Eclectic Vince Guaraldi, Alma-Ville) as well as Vince Guaraldi with the San Francisco Boys Chorus (1967) released on Guaraldi's own D&D record label. Guaraldi's three Warner Bros. albums were released separately by Omnivore Recordings as part of the 2-disc set The Complete Warner Bros.–Seven Arts Recordings in July 2018.

Critical reception
PopMatters critic Andrew Zender commented that "the buoyant brilliance of [Guaraldi]'s tunes transport you to another place — and can even make you feel like a kid again, or like dancing on a piano. Isn't that what all music is supposed to do?" AllMusic critic Al Campbell noted that The Definitive Vince Guaraldi is a "noteworthy compilation [that] focuses not only on Guaraldi as the composer of songs from the Charlie Brown television cartoon, but as a versatile jazz pianist."

Track listing

Personnel
Credits adapted from 2009 CD liner notes.

 Vince Guaraldi – piano, electric piano ("Thanksgiving Theme")
 Eddie Duran – guitar ("Fascinating Rhythm", "Fenwyck's Farfel", "A Flower Is A Lovesome Thing", "Softly, As In A Morning Sunrise", "Jitterbug Waltz", "On Green Dolphin Street", "Mr. Lucky", "Corcovado", "Work Song")
 John Gray – guitar ("Great Pumpkin Waltz")
 Bola Sete – guitar ("Star Song", "Days of Wine and Roses", "Ginza", "The Girl From Ipanema")
 Tom Beeson – double bass ("El Matador", "Theme To Grace")
 Dean Reilly – double bass ("Fascinating Rhythm", "Fenwyck's Farfel", "A Flower Is A Lovesome Thing", "Softly, As In A Morning Sunrise")
 Eugene Wright – double bass ("Calling Dr. Funk")
 Fred Marshall – double bass ("Jitterbug Waltz", "On Green Dolphin Street", "Star Song", "Days Of Wine And Roses", "Mr. Lucky", "Corcovado", "Work Song", "Christmas Is Coming", "Christmas Time Is Here", "Skating")
 Monty Budwig – double bass ("Samba De Orfeu", "Cast Your Fate to the Wind", "Manhã De Carnaval", "Moon River", "Ginza", "The Girl From Ipanema", "Oh, Good Grief", "Linus and Lucy", "Charlie Brown Theme", "Great Pumpkin Waltz", "Autumn Leaves", "Blues For Peanuts")
 Seward McCain – electric bass ("Thanksgiving Theme")
 Colin Bailey – drums ("Samba De Orfeu", "Cast Your Fate To The Wind", "Manhã De Carnaval", "Moon River", "Jitterbug Waltz", "On Green Dolphin Street", "Oh, Good Grief", "Linus and Lucy", "Charlie Brown Theme", "Great Pumpkin Waltz", "Autumn Leaves", "Blues For Peanuts")
 Jerry Granelli – drums ("Star Song", "Days Of Wine And Roses", "Mr. Lucky", "Corcovado", "Work Song", "Christmas is Coming", "Christmas Time Is Here (instrumental)", "Skating")
  – drums ("Calling Dr. Funk")
 Lee Charlton – drums ("El Matador", "Theme To Grace")
 Mike Clark – drums ("Thanksgiving Theme")
 Nicholas Martinez – drums ("Ginza", "The Girl From Ipanema")
 Jerry Dodgion – alto saxophone ("Calling Dr. Funk")
 Benny Velarde – timbales ("Work Song")
 Chuck Bennett – trombone ("Thanksgiving Theme")
 Emmanuel Klein – trumpet ("Great Pumpkin Waltz")
 Tom Harrell – trumpet ("Thanksgiving Theme")
 Bill Fitch – congas ("Work Song")
 St. Paul's Church of San Rafael 68-voice choir – choral chanting ("Theme To Grace")
 Barry Mineah – St. Paul's Church of San Rafael choral director ("Theme To Grace")

Additional
Charles M. Schulz – cover illustration
Doug Ramsey – liner notes

References

External links
 

2009 compilation albums
Albums arranged by Vince Guaraldi
Albums produced by Vince Guaraldi
Fantasy Records compilation albums
Concord Records compilation albums
Vince Guaraldi albums
Vince Guaraldi compilation albums
Cool jazz compilation albums
Mainstream jazz compilation albums